Denmark–Mexico relations are the foreign relations between Denmark and Mexico.  Both nations are members of the Organisation for Economic Co-operation and Development and the United Nations.

History 

The first known Dane to visit Mexico was Brother Jacob the Dacian, a Danish prince who came to Mexico in 1542 and lived among the indigenous people in southern Mexico. Diplomatic relations commenced on 19 July 1827 with the signing of a Treaty of Friendship, Trade and Navigation between both nations.

In 1864, Mexico named its first minister (ambassador) to Denmark. Soon afterwards, an honorary consulate of Mexico was opened in Copenhagen under the Consulate-General of Mexico in Hamburg, Germany, and in March 1931 the first Mexican legation was opened in the Danish capital. During World War II, Mexico closed its legation in Denmark, while Denmark maintained its diplomatic office in Mexico open. Soon after the end of the war, Mexico re-opened its legation in Copenhagen and in 1956, both countries elevated their diplomatic representations to that of embassies.

In 1966, Crown Princess (and future Queen) Margrethe II of Denmark paid an official visit to Mexico. Since the initial visit, there have been several high-level visits between leaders of both nations. In 2007 President Felipe Calderón made the first visit by a Mexican president to Denmark.

In 2017, both nations celebrated 190 years of diplomatic relations.

High-level visits

High-level visits from Denmark to Mexico

 Queen (and as Princess) Margrethe II of Denmark (1966, 2008)
 Prime Minister Poul Schlüter (1989)
 Prime Minister Anders Fogh Rasmussen (2002, 2003)
 Prince Frederik (2013)
 Prime Minister Lars Løkke Rasmussen (2017)

High-level visits from Mexico to Denmark

 President Felipe Calderón (2007, 2009)
 President Enrique Peña Nieto (2016)

Bilateral Agreements 
Over the years, both nations have signed several bilateral agreements such as an Agreement for Economic Cooperation; Agreement for the Mutual Protection of the Works of Authors, Composers and Artists; Agreement for Scientific and Technical Cooperation; Agreement to Avoid Double Taxation and Prevent Tax Evasion in Income and Property Taxes; and an Agreement for the Promotion and Reciprocal Protection of Investments.

Transportation
There are direct flights between Cancún International Airport and Copenhagen Airport with the following airlines: Thomas Cook Airlines Scandinavia and TUI Airways.

Trade
In 1997, Mexico signed a Free Trade Agreement with the European Union (which includes Denmark). Since then, trade between the two nations have increased dramatically. In 2018, two-way trade between both nations amounted to US$904 million. Denmark's main exports to Mexico include: electronics, toys, medicines, surgical tools and industrial machinery. Mexico's main exports to Denmark include: airplane parts, centrifuges, computers, motors, generators, medicines and telephones (including mobile phones). 

Denmark is the largest investor in Mexico of all the Nordic countries and there are 218 Danish companies operating in Mexico, mainly in the industries of manufacturing, construction and transportation. Danish multinational companies such as Maersk, Grundfos, Lego, Danisco, Novo Nordisk, FLSmidth and Danfoss operate in Mexico. Mexican multinational company Cemex operates in Denmark along with 31 other Mexican companies operating in the country.

Resident diplomatic missions
 Denmark has an embassy in Mexico City.
 Mexico has an embassy in Copenhagen.

See also 
 Foreign relations of Denmark    
 Foreign relations of Mexico
 Frans Blom
 Mogens Amdi Petersen
 Scandinavian immigration to Mexico

References 

 
Mexico
Bilateral relations of Mexico